Scattering Fork is a stream in Audrain County in the U.S. state of Missouri. It is a tributary of the South Fork of the Salt River which it joins approximately four miles southeast of Mexico.

Scattering Fork was so named on account of its irregular course.

See also
List of rivers of Missouri

References

Rivers of Audrain County, Missouri
Rivers of Missouri